Bucculatrix makabana is a moth in the  family Bucculatricidae. It was described by Wolfram Mey in 1999. It is found in Yemen.

References

External links
Natural History Museum Lepidoptera generic names catalog

Bucculatricidae
Moths described in 1999
Moths of the Arabian Peninsula